Ark is a web series set on a mysterious bio-dome spaceship – the Ark. The two main characters, Connie and Daryl, explore the vacant ship trying to learn their fate. The show's episodes run from 3 to 9 minutes in length. Liz Shannon Miller of GigaOM said that Ark has the rare combination of a sci-fi series with great production values and great writing.

All nine episodes are now available on Hulu. In a 2009 interview, Gabe Sachs and Trey Stokes stated that they would like the opportunity to continue this as a web series.

References

External links 
Ark at Hulu
 

American science fiction web series